The 1996 United States presidential election in Missouri took place on November 5, 1996, as part of the 1996 United States presidential election. Voters chose eleven representatives, or electors to the Electoral College, who voted for president and vice president.

Missouri was won by President Bill Clinton (D) over Senator Bob Dole (R-KS), with Clinton winning 47.54% to 41.24% for margin of 6.3%. Billionaire businessman Ross Perot (Reform Party of the United States of America-TX) finished in third, with 10.06% of the popular vote. From 1904 to 2004, the state has been carried by the winner of the presidential election, with the exceptions of the election of 1956. The state was carried by the Republicans in 2000, and continued to move rightward in future elections (with the exception of 2008) with its white, rural, culturally conservative population following in the direction of neighboring Southern states like Arkansas. Missouri indeed appears to have lost its bellwether status, voting significantly more Republican than the nation since 2004. 

As of the 2020 presidential election, this was the last time in which Missouri voted Democratic as well as the last time that Hickory County, Benton County, Mercer County, Caldwell County, Grundy County, Crawford County, Carroll County, Franklin County, St. Clair County, Livingston County, DeKalb County, Lafayette County, St. Francois County, Daviess County, Bates County, Madison County, Montgomery County, Sullivan County, Clark County, Nodaway County, Henry County, Vernon County, Gentry County, Macon County, Knox County, Wayne County, Ripley County, Clinton County, Monroe County, Ralls County, Randolph County, Dunklin County, Reynolds County, Oregon County, Howard County, Shannon County, Shelby County, Callaway County, Scott County, Lincoln County, Audrain County, Pike County, Marion County, Lewis County, Scotland County, Schuyler County, Chariton County, Worth County, and Linn County voted for a Democratic presidential candidate.

Results

Results by county

See also
 United States presidential elections in Missouri
 Presidency of Bill Clinton

References

Missouri
1996
1996 Missouri elections